Jürgen "Atze" Friedrich (born 11 November 1943 in Dresden) is a retired German football player. He spent 11 seasons in the Bundesliga with Eintracht Frankfurt and 1. FC Kaiserslautern.

He spent three stints as the president of 1. FC Kaiserslautern from 1970s to 1990s.

Honours
 DFB-Pokal finalist: 1963–64, 1971–72

References

External links
 

1943 births
Living people
German footballers
Eintracht Frankfurt players
1. FC Kaiserslautern players
Bundesliga players

Association football midfielders
Footballers from Dresden
Footballers from Berlin
West German footballers
German sports executives and administrators